Catherine Louveau (born 6 June 1950 in Champlan) is a French sociologist and academic. She is president of the Emilie Du Châtelet Institute.

Her work focuses on the conditions and challenges of women's access to sporting practices, and the sex differences of sporting practices.

She is professor emeritus at the Paris-Sud University.

Works 

 
 
 
 Annick Davisse; Catherine Louveau, Sports, école, société : la part des femmes, Joinville-le-Pont : Actio, 1991. ISBN 9782906411067

References 

Living people
1950 births
French sociologists